Agaricus bresadolanus is a species of fungus in the genus Agaricus. It was described by Hungarian mycologist Gábor Bohus in 1969. A rare species, it has been recorded in Asia and southern Europe, where it fruits singly or in groups along paths and in grassy area of deciduous woodland. It spores are ellipsoid and lack a germ pore, with dimensions of 5.5–7.5 by 4.0–5.0 µm.

See also
List of Agaricus species

References

External links
 

bresadolanus
Fungi described in 1969
Fungi of Europe
Edible fungi